Rana Abdul Sattar Khan is a Pakistani politician who had been a Member of the Provincial Assembly of the Punjab from August 2018 till January 2023. Previously he was a member of the Punjab Assembly from June 2013 to May 2018 and was a member of the National Assembly of Pakistan from 2008 to 2013.

Early life
He was born on 2 March 1982.

Political career
He was elected to the National Assembly of Pakistan from Constituency NA-112 (Sialkot-III) as a candidate of Pakistan Muslim League-N (PML-N) in 2008 Pakistani general election. He received 92,182 votes and defeated Shujaat Hussain. In the same election, he was elected to the Provincial Assembly of the Punjab as a candidate of PML-N from Constituency PP-124 (Sialkot-V). He received 36,078 and defeated Malik Tahir Akhtar, a candidate of Pakistan Peoples Party (PPP). He vacated the Punjab Assembly seat.

He was re-elected to the Provincial Assembly of the Punjab as a candidate of PML-N from Constituency PP-124 (Sialkot-V) in 2013 Pakistani general election. He received 55,565 votes and defeated Malik Jamshed Ghias, a candidate of Pakistan Tehreek-e-Insaf (PTI).

He was re-elected to Provincial Assembly of the Punjab as a candidate of PML-N from Constituency PP-45 (Sialkot-XI) in 2018 Pakistani general election.

References

Living people
Pakistani MNAs 2008–2013
Punjab MPAs 2013–2018
1982 births
Pakistan Muslim League (N) MPAs (Punjab)
Punjab MPAs 2018–2023